Bagrat Oghanian (5 February 1981 – 18 December 2021) was an Armenian boxer best known for winning the Super Heavyweight Bronze medal at the 2000 European Amateur Boxing Championships.

Life and career
As an amateur, he scored his biggest success by winning Bronze in Tampere 2000. Oghanian turned pro in 2002 in the United States but wasn't successful. He lost to unknown Valery Chechenev and retired in 2005.

Oghanian died on 18 December 2021, at the age of 40.

References

External links

1981 births
2021 deaths
American people of Armenian descent
Armenian male boxers
Super-heavyweight boxers